Uladislao Silva (2 January 1840 – 3 October 1898) was a Bolivian military officer who was de facto President of Bolivia after becoming the head of the Government Junta installed in La Paz after the overthrow of Hilarión Daza. Silva was made Supreme Chief of the Junta on December 28, 1879.

Early life and family 
Silva was born in La Paz to Pedro Juan Silva and Luisa Arancibia. From humble beginnings, he joined the Military College of La Paz. He would reach the rank of colonel in 1876 after participating in the mutiny in Santa Cruz de la Sierra during the coup that ousted Tomás Frías. He was married to Margarita Portillo on May 26, 1862.

Silva's rise in the military ranks was greatly due to his relationship with Agustín Morales, who served as President between 1871 and 1872. Silva served as aide-de-camp to Morales and was in the President's inner circle, always dining with him.

Prelude to the War of the Pacific

The treaty with he Compañía de Salitres y Ferrocarril de Antofagasta 
In 1873, the Bolivian government signed an agreement with the representative of the Compañía de Salitres y Ferrocarril de Antofagasta, an agreement that at the beginning of 1878 was not yet in force, because, according to the Bolivian constitution, contracts on natural resources had to be approved by congress. This was done by the Bolivian National Constituent Assembly through a law, on February 14, 1878, on the condition that a tax of 10 cents per quintal of saltpeter exported by the company be paid.

For Chile, the collection of the tax of 10 cents per quintal exported explicitly violated article IV of the 1874 Treaty between Bolivia and Chile, which prohibited raising taxes for twenty-five years on "Chilean people, industries and capital working between parallels 23 º and 24º" and residents in that area. Bolivia counterargued that the company was not a "Chilean citizen" nor a resident but a commercial entity, which constituted, according to the laws of Bolivia, as subject, therefore, to its ius imperium. The Chilean owners of the affected company flatly refused to pay said tax, considering it to be abusive, and requested help from the government of Chile. Santiago pledged their support for the company's cause, despite the fact that it was a dispute between a private company and the Bolivian State.

The Chilean government considered it a bilateral case and endorsed the sui generis of the conflict. Thus, began the diplomatic conflict between Bolivia and Chile that escalated rapidly in magnitude given the lack of diplomatic tact of Daza's government. Peru participated as a mediator in the resulting crisis, deciding to send a Special Ambassador and Plenipotentiary to Santiago to try to avoid a possible war through negotiation. The treaty indicated that the controversies that give rise to "the intelligence and execution of the Treaty" should be submitted to arbitration.

The occupation of Antofagasta 
On November 17, 1878, the government of La Paz ordered the prefect of the department of Cobija, Severino Zapata, to enforce the 10-cent tax established by the Law of February 14, 1878 in an attempt to counteract the serious economic crisis in Bolivia. Thus, originating the casus belli. Subsequently, on February 1, 1879, the government of Bolivia unilaterally rescinded the contract, suspending the effects of the law of February 14, 1878, and decided to claim the saltpeter fields occupied by the Compañía de Salitres y Ferrocarriles de Antofagasta. They proceeded to auction the assets of the company in order to collect the unpaid taxes, using armed force in the process. The auction was scheduled for February 14, 1879. Daza ignored the probability of Chilean retaliation. Chile occupied Antofagasta that same February 14, 1879, frustrating the auction. Daza, citing invasion as a casus belli, declared war on Chile. The secret treaty between Peru and Bolivia signed in 1873 in which former pledged to support the latter militarily in case of conflict with Chile. Chile declared war on Bolivia on March 5, 1879, and proceeded to occupy the Bolivian coast, asserting old unresolved territorial claims regarding the coast between those parallels.

The War of the Pacific

First phase: The unchallenged occupation of the Bolivian Litoral 

The entire Bolivian coastline was occupied by Chilean troops, completely unchallenged by the Bolivian Army. A widely spread version of the events of the outbreak of the war affirms that Daza celebrated his birthday when Chile invaded Antofagasta. Coinciding with carnival, it is said that Daza withheld the news of the Chilean invasion so as not to interrupt the festivities. However, this has never been confirmed.

Finally, on February 28, the news of the Chilean invasion was known in Bolivia. On March 1, Daza declared the breakdown of communications with Chile and the seizure of the properties of Chilean citizens with the use of force. At the same time, he claimed the support of Peru, in compliance with the Defensive Alliance Treaty signed in 1873.

Second phase: Bolivian declaration of war and Peru's entrance 
The Peruvian government urgently sent a diplomatic envoy to Santiago to mediate in the Chilean-Bolivian conflict. The mission was headed by José Antonio de Lavalle and arrived in Valparaíso on March 4. However, while these peace negotiations took place, Daza, in an evident attempt to make the negotiations fail and force Peru to join the conflict, declared war on Chile on March 14. 

On March 23, Bolivian and Chilean forces clashed in the Battle of Calama, with the Chileans taking the victory. Finally, on April 5, Chile declared war on Peru, after this country refused to remain neutral in the conflict. As the war progressed, the Chileans began slowly pushing the Allied Forces to toward defeat. For this reason, in the midst of the war, Daza secretly negotiated with Chilean agents to separate Bolivia from the conflict and leave Peru to its own devices; In return, Bolivia would receive compensation for the loss of its coastline; the delivery of Tacna and Arica. These negotiations never materialized due to the disapproval of Bolivia's congress.

Third phase: Daza as the Supreme Commander of the Army and coup 

Daza withdrew from the position of head of state by supreme decree on April 17, 1879, in order to personally assume command of the army and march at the head of the Bolivian forces. He led them to Tacna, and after the Chilean landing in Pisagua, he marched south to support the Peruvian Army stationed in Iquique. After staying in Arica briefly, he continued marching. However, after three days of marching along the Camarones ravine, he announced to Peruvian President Mariano Ignacio Prado that his troops refused to continue due to the harsh conditions of the desert, opting to return to Arica. Daza's telegram to Prado on November 16 read, "Desert overwhelms, army refuses to move forward," verbatim. This decision significantly affected the direction of the war, leaving Peru virtually alone in the conflict.

Meanwhile, the Peruvian army stationed in the port of Iquique under the command of General Juan Buendía, decided to advance inland. Buendía trusted the arrival of Daza's forces to break the Chilean lines. But the news of Daza's retreat had a tremendous demoralizing effect on the Peruvian troops, who suffered a serious defeat in San Francisco on November 19. Daza returned to Arica, where he learned of his dismissal as President of Bolivia on December 28 after to a coup d'état was staged by the military amid enormous discontent among the population over the direction of the war. He then moved to Arequipa, where he waited for his family to join him; This done, he left for Europe. Armed with considerable financial resources, having left with a portion of Bolivia's treasury, he settled in Paris, France. In Bolivia, General Narciso Campero replaced Daza after playing a crucial role in the latter's ouster. It was in this unstable scenario that Silva rose to power.

The La Paz Junta and downfall 
Silva was in command of the battalion Victoria, which had been given orders to march from La Paz to Tacna. However, Silva instead spearheaded a coup against the absent Daza and successfully ousted him. Silva's coup coincided with Eliodoro Camacho's, essentially leading to the Council of Ministers ruling the country, under the presidency of Serapio Reyes Ortiz, to abdicate and allow this de facto takeover. A Government Junta was set up in La Paz composed of Silva, Donato Vásquez, and Rudecindo Carvajal. On January 4, 1880, Silva assigned Campero as Commander in Chief of the Bolivian Army.

After weeks of deliberation, General Campero was chosen to as provisional President of the Republic. Silva was outraged by this fact as he believed he had been chosen by the people to lead the country and, thus, he represented the will of the masses. Although Silva objected to Campero's election, not a single Department in the country recognized the Junta anymore, forcing him cede power.

The March 12 mutiny 
Silva, discontent with the dissolution of the junta and his exclusion from the Presidency, "had the naive illusion that the people of La Paz had anointed him Chief of the entire Nation and he remained resentful, realizing that he had only been used for an emergency". Campero was aware of Silva's dissatisfaction, and in an attempt to pacify him, the Colonel was made Inspector General of the Bolivian Army. In this position, Silva mutinied in Viacha and occupied the Plaza Murillo of La Paz on March 12, 1880. However, by March 18, the mutiny was crushed after the rebels were dispersed in El Alto and several of the leader executed as Silva fled toward Chiclayo. The mutiny is said to have resulted in the deaths of two thousand men. 

José Manuel Guachalla, one of Silva's accomplices, justified the acts of that day as follows:This procedure and his [Silva] tenacity in separating from all political participation those who he [Campero] and his henchmen called corralistas, forced, without a doubt, Colonel Uladislao Silva to the revolution of 12 March 1880. I express myself with the military honesty that I have always accustomed.Eliodoro Camacho, in a letter he wrote to Silva on March 16, four days after the mutiny, expressed:Meanwhile, Colonel, allow me to ask you: Have you weighed the enormous responsibility that you have placed on your shoulders? The clarity of your intelligence makes me understand that yes; but allow me to renew it again before your meditation. You have stopped the sending of four battalions to this [Campero] Headquarters, at the moment in which they undertake their departure by order of the President, who knew, through my repeated trades, how urgent the precise thing, which was his coming to confront the enemy, who by occupying us in Moquegua, has cut off the resources of the North. Without which the Peruvian army, which accompanies the Bolivian army in this Department, cannot survive. This fact has produced in both armies, and in this people, who longingly awaited that reinforcement, such discouragement which is hardly comparable to the disappointment caused in the army of the South by the withdrawal of Camarones... That withdrawal and the Viacha revolution will be, Colonel, two equally culminating events among those which cause our defeat in this infamous war... And what do we call, Colonel, he who promotes internal anarchy at times where your country is engaged in a national war? I have broken my pen a thousand times before writing that word that usually marks a man's forehead. Oh! With the white-hot iron of eternal opprobrium, which I do not want to use as a description of the man I once called 'friend'...Silva's actions only served to ruin his own reputation and solidify Campero's. After the mutiny was crushed, Campero emerged as the most popular political leader. Silva was allowed to return in years to come and faced trial for crimes committed during the March 12 mutiny. He died in 1898, aged 58.

References 

Presidents of Bolivia